Chenar (also Romanized as Chenār; also known as Qal‘eh-ye Chenār) is a village in Hamaijan Rural District, Hamaijan District, Sepidan County, Fars Province, Iran. At the 2006 census, its population was 69, in 16 families.

References 

Populated places in Sepidan County